Douglas Cameron (born 8 February 1983) is a Scottish professional footballer.

Career
Cameron started his senior career with Dundee, for whom he made 11 appearances in the Scottish Premier League. He subsequently played for a few Scottish Football League clubs, including Peterhead and East Fife. In January 2010, he was released by Peterhead to allow him to take up an opportunity to play football in Australia. Cameron returned to Scotland later that year and signed for Montrose in October. He left Montrose in 2012 and has since played in junior football for Ballingry Rovers and Broughty Athletic.

References

External links 

1983 births
Living people
Footballers from Dundee
Scottish footballers
Association football midfielders
Peterhead F.C. players
Dundee F.C. players
Forfar Athletic F.C. players
East Fife F.C. players
Scottish Football League players
Ballingry Rovers F.C. players
Montrose F.C. players
Scottish expatriate footballers
Expatriate soccer players in Australia
Scottish expatriate sportspeople in Australia
Caroline Springs George Cross FC players
Broughty Athletic F.C. players
Scottish Premier League players